Charsadda Tehsil is a tehsil located in Charsadda District, Khyber Pakhtunkhwa, Pakistan.

Overview & History
During British rule Charsadda was the North-western tehsil of Peshawar District, its boundaries were larger than today lying between 34°2' and 34°32' N.
The population was 142,756 according to the 1901 census an increase of almost 10,000 since the 1891 census (132,917). It contained three towns, Charsadda, Prang (19,354) and Tangi, with 168 villages. The land revenue and cesses amounted in 1903-4 to Rs. 3,60,000.

The tehsil consisted of the doab and the Hashtnagar tappas or circles. The former lies between the Adizai branch of the Kabul river and the Swat, and is fertile, highly cultivated, with numerous villages, and better wooded than other parts of the District; even the uplands which run along the foot of the Mohmand hills for their whole length are now irrigated by private canals. It is mainly held by the Gigyani tribe of Pakhtuns. The Hashtnagar tappa comprises a strip of plain country with a rich clay soil, which stretches  eastward of the Swat, and from the Utman Khel hills on the north to the Kabul River on the south. It is held by Muhammadzai (Charsadda), and in it lies Charsadda, the headquarters of the tehsil. This tappa is intersected by the Swat River Canal.

Administration
The tehsil is administratively subdivided into 34 Union Councils, four of which form the headquarters - Charsadda. Under KP local government act 2015, Charsadda is divided into 64 Village
Councils (VC) and 11 Neighbourhood Councils (NC).

The population of Charsadda Tehsil, according to 2017 consensus, is 804,194 while according to 1998 consensus, it was 527,152.

List of Union Councils in Tehsil Charsadda 
1.	UC-I	13.	Behlola
2.	UC-II	14.	Dargai
3.	UC-III	15.	Dosehra
4.	UC-IV	16.	Sheikho
5.	Agra	17.	Meera Prang
6.	Tarnab	18.	Nisatta
7.	Hisara Yaseen Zai 19.Dheri Zardad
8.	utman Zai	20.	Mera Umer Zai
9.	Turangzai	21.	Chindro Dag
10.	Sarki Titara	22.	Umer Zai
11.	Muhammad Nari	23.	Rajjar-I
12.	Khan Mai	24.	Rajjar-II
		25.	Gunda Karkana

See also 
 Tangi Tehsil
 Shabqadar Tehsil
 Charsadda District

References

Charsadda District, Pakistan
Tehsils of Khyber Pakhtunkhwa